Eneas Lakes Provincial Park is a provincial park in British Columbia, Canada, located west of the town of Peachland, to the south of Peachland Creek.  The park is approximately 1036 ha. in size and was established in 1968.  The Eneas Lakes lie at the head of Finlay Creek.

References

Provincial parks of British Columbia
Provincial parks in the Okanagan
1968 establishments in British Columbia
Protected areas established in 1968
Osoyoos Division Yale Land District